Jonas Bjurström (born 24 March 1979) is a Swedish footballer who plays for FC Trollhättan as a midfielder.

References

External links

1979 births
Living people
Association football midfielders
IFK Norrköping players
Västra Frölunda IF players
Trelleborgs FF players
BK Häcken players
Esbjerg fB players
Allsvenskan players
Danish Superliga players
Superettan players
Swedish footballers
Sweden under-21 international footballers
Swedish expatriate footballers
Utsiktens BK players
Expatriate men's footballers in Denmark